Stenometopiini is a tribe of leafhoppers in the subfamily Deltocephalinae. It contains 8 genera and around 100 species. The members of Stenometopiini are widespread and have a cosmopolitan distribution.

Genera 
There are currently 8 described genera in Stenometopiini:

References 

Deltocephalinae